The Hollow is a neighborhood in the city of Bridgeport, Connecticut.  The neighborhood is the most densely populated in the city.  The neighborhood has been home to immigrants throughout its history.  Approximately 30 percent of residents of the Hollow are foreign born.  Sterling Hill Historic District is located in the neighborhood. The neighborhood is home to two public schools, Geraldine Johnson and Columbus school.

References

Neighborhoods in Connecticut